Joseph Pierre Stéphane Robidas  (born March 3, 1977) is a Canadian former professional ice hockey defenceman who currently works as assistant coach for the Montreal Canadiens.

Robidas played over 900 games in the NHL, most of which came within the Dallas Stars' organization. He also played for the Montreal Canadiens, Chicago Blackhawks, Anaheim Ducks, and Toronto Maple Leafs.

Playing career

Amateur
As a youth, Robidas played in the 1990 and 1991 Quebec International Pee-Wee Hockey Tournaments with a minor ice hockey team from Sherbrooke, Quebec.

Montreal Canadiens
Robidas was selected 164th overall by the Montreal Canadiens in the 7th round of the 1995 NHL Entry Draft. During his three seasons with the Canadiens, Robidas recorded 23 points in 122 games.

Dallas Stars
On October 4, 2002, Robidas was claimed by the Atlanta Thrashers as part of the NHL Waiver Draft, and subsequently was dealt to the Dallas Stars for a 6th round selection in 2002. He appeared in a career-high 76 games during the 2002–03 NHL season.

Chicago Blackhawks
Robidas was traded to the Chicago Blackhawks in November 2003 for Jon Klemm and a fourth round selection in the 2004 NHL Entry Draft. Robidas skated in 45 games for the Blackhawks during the subsequent season. Due to the 2004–05 NHL lockout, Robidas played for the Frankfurt Lions of the Deutsche Eishockey Liga (DEL) during the entire 2004–05 lockout season. Later in the season, he was joined on the team by fellow NHLer Doug Weight, and the pair became fan favorites.

Return to Dallas
In August 2005, following the lockout, Robidas returned to the Stars by signing a two-year contract.

In December 2006 the Stars signed him to a three-year, USD$4.5 million contract extension. On March 17, 2007, he was punched while charging Jordin Tootoo of the Nashville Predators after Mike Modano had been checked by Tootoo. Tootoo still had his gloves on when he punched Robidas, and he hit Robidas square in the face. Robidas went down hard and was taken off the ice on a stretcher. He was taken to a hospital for examination. He later checked out of the hospital after being diagnosed with a concussion and flew back to Dallas with the team.

During the 2008 NHL playoffs against the Anaheim Ducks in game 5, Robidas took a clearing shot from Todd Marchant off the face that broke his nose. He returned to the game after receiving stitches and had a solid outing even though Dallas came up short 5–2. The next game in Dallas, Robidas scored the game tying goal shortly before he would set up Stu Barnes for the series-clinching goal, as Dallas went on to defeat the Anaheim Ducks 4–1 and take the series 4–2 on home ice.

Robidas was selected to play in the 57th NHL All-Star Game in Montreal despite having suffered a broken jaw.

Robidas won TSN's "No Guts, No Glory" contest, an unofficial award for the 2008–09 NHL season's toughest player. He was selected as the winner after a loose puck had broken his jaw in a game against the Phoenix Coyotes; Robidas missed only one shift after the incident and played more minutes than any skater in that game.

He was also placed on a stand-by list by Team Canada for the 2010 Winter Olympics should an injury occur during the tournament.

Anaheim Ducks
During the 2013–14 season, on November 29, 2013 against the Chicago Blackhawks Robidas broke his right leg in a collision with the boards behind the net. Nearing a return to full health, Robidas was traded to the Anaheim Ducks for a 2014 fourth-round draft pick on March 4, 2014. During the 2014 Stanley Cup Playoffs, in his first game back in Dallas as a member of the Ducks, Robidas fractured his right leg again just above the previous fracture.

Toronto Maple Leafs
On July 1, 2014, Robidas signed a three-year, $9 million contract with the Toronto Maple Leafs. In poor health due to the two leg fractures sustained in the 13–14 season, Robidas, after one season with the Leafs, sat out the entirety of the following 2015–16 and 2016–17 seasons.  Robidas joined the Maple Leafs' front office as a consultant in January 2017, effectively signalling his retirement from the league. He became an assistant director of player development in September 2017 and promoted to become the director of player development in August 2018.

Career statistics

Regular season and playoffs

International

Awards and honours

References

External links
 

1977 births
Anaheim Ducks players
Canadian expatriate ice hockey players in Finland
Canadian expatriate ice hockey players in Germany
Canadian ice hockey defencemen
Chicago Blackhawks players
Dallas Stars players
Frankfurt Lions players
Fredericton Canadiens players
French Quebecers
HIFK (ice hockey) players
Ice hockey people from Quebec
Living people
Montreal Canadiens draft picks
Montreal Canadiens players
Montreal Canadiens coaches
National Hockey League All-Stars
Quebec Citadelles players
Shawinigan Cataractes players
Sportspeople from Sherbrooke
Toronto Maple Leafs coaches
Toronto Maple Leafs players